The 1965–66 Bundesliga was the third season of the Bundesliga, West Germany's premier football league. It began on 14 August 1965 and ended on 28 May 1966. Werder Bremen were the defending champions.

Competition modus
Every team played two games against each other team, one at home and one away. Teams received two points for a win and one point for a draw. If two or more teams were tied on points, places were determined by goal average. The team with the most points were crowned champions while the two teams with the fewest points were relegated to their respective Regionalliga divisions.

Team changes to 1964–65
Karlsruher SC and FC Schalke 04 would initially have been relegated for finishing in the bottom two places. However, Hertha BSC were found guilty of illegal financial behavior and, as a consequence, had their Bundesliga license revoked. The German FA then decided to keep Karlsruhe and Schalke in the league and expand its size to 18 teams. Bayern Munich and Borussia Mönchengladbach were promoted after having won their respective promotion play-off groups. In order to still have a representative from West Berlin in the league, the amateur side Tasmania Berlin were also granted promotion.

Season overview
The 1965–66 season was the inaugural season for the two most successful clubs regarding league titles in Bundesliga history, Borussia Mönchengladbach and Bayern Munich. It was also the first time that a city had two clubs in the Bundesliga. Bayern were a title contender for large parts of the season, but eventually were held short three points by their cross-town rivals 1860, who won their first championship. Nevertheless, the newcomers had something to celebrate as well, as they won the DFB Cup one week after the end of the season, which they finished in third place.

Borussia Dortmund finished in second place, ahead on goal average to Bayern Munich. They also had huge title chances until late in the season, but were beaten 2–0 at home by 1860 on the second-to-last match day. However, Dortmund did not end the season without a title as well, as they beat Liverpool 2–1 after extra time in the UEFA Cup Winners' Cup final at Glasgow's Hampden Park three days earlier. It marked the first time that a German club had won a European championship.

At the other end of the table, another famous German club had a historic season as well – but in the worst way possible. Tasmania Berlin were added to the league just two weeks before the start of the season after city rivals Hertha BSC had been thrown out on financial irregularities. They were not even first choice for a replacement as the Berlin representative, as they had only finished in third place in Regionalliga Berlin. But when champions Tennis Borussia were considered too weak after failing in the promotion play-off rounds and therefore were not asked, and runners-up Spandauer SV declined their interest in a Bundesliga spot as well, Tasmania gladly accepted the invitation by the German FA.

The decision turned out to be a fatal one for the club. Tasmania's team was never capable of competing in the Bundesliga. They set up a various number of records, including, among others, lowest point total (8), fewest wins (2), most losses (28), fewest goals scored (15), most goals against (108) and lowest match attendance for a Bundesliga game (827 against Borussia Mönchengladbach on 15 January 1966). Most of the records are still intact.

Team overview

League table

Results

Top scorers
31 goals
  Lothar Emmerich (Borussia Dortmund)

26 goals
  Friedhelm Konietzka (TSV 1860 Munich)

20 goals
  Arnold Schütz (Werder Bremen)

18 goals
  Peter Grosser (TSV 1860 Munich)
  Johannes Löhr (1. FC Köln)
  Manfred Pohlschmidt (Hamburger SV)

17 goals
  Wilhelm Huberts (Eintracht Frankfurt)
  Lothar Ulsaß (Eintracht Braunschweig)

16 goals
  Bernd Rupp (Borussia Mönchengladbach)

15 goals
  Rudolf Brunnenmeier (TSV 1860 Munich)
  Hans Siemensmayer (Hannover 96)

Champion squad

See also
1965–66 DFB-Pokal

References

External links
DFB Archive 1965–66

Bundesliga seasons
1
Germany